Oghuz Khagan or Oghuz Khan (Azerbaijani: Oğuz Xan or Oğuz Xaqan) is a legendary khan of the Turkic people and an eponymous ancestor of Oghuz Turks. Some Turkic cultures use the legend of Oghuz Khan to describe their ethnic and tribal origins. The various versions of the narrative preserved in many different manuscripts has been published in numerous languages as listed below in the references. The narratives about him are often entitled Oghuzname, of which there are several traditions, describing his many feats and conquests, some of these tend to overlap with other Turkic epic traditions such as Seljukname and The Book of Dede Korkut.

The name of Oghuz Khan has been associated with Maodun, also known as Mete Han; the reason being that there is a remarkable similarity between the biography of Oghuz Khagan in the Turkic mythology and the biography of Maodun found in the Chinese historiography, which was first noticed by the Russo-Chuvash sinologist Hyacinth.

Sources
The legend of Oghuz Khan is one of a number of different origin narratives that circulated among the Turkic peoples of Central Asia. It was first recorded in the 13th century.

The anonymous Uyghur vertical script narrative of the 14th century, which is preserved in Paris, is a manuscript that was probably already being modified to fit with stories of the Mongol Conquest, as Paul Pelliot has shown and it does have suggestions of Oghuz Khan's later significance as Islamizer of the Turks, and does not include the figure of Moghul (Mongol) as an ancestor of Oghuz Khan.

Abū’l-Ghāzī's 17th-century version called Shajara-i Tarākima (Genealogy of the Turkmen) roughly follows Rashīd ad-Dīn's already Mongolized (post-conquest) version of the early 14th century. But in his account, Oghuz Khan is more fully integrated into Islamic and Mongol traditional history. The account begins with the descent from Adam to Noah, who after the flood sends his three sons to repopulate the earth: Ham was sent to Africa, Sam to Iran, and Yafes went to the banks of the Itil and Yaik rivers and had eight sons named Turk, Khazar, Saqlab, Rus, Ming, Chin, Kemeri, and Tarikh. As he was dying he established Turk as his successor.

Turk settled at Issiq Kul and was succeeded by Tutek, the eldest of his four sons. Four generations after him came three sons: Tatar, Qara, and Moghul(Mongol), who divided the kingdom between them. Qara Khan begat Oghuz Khan. For three days he would not nurse and every night he appeared in his mother's dream and told his mother to become a Muslim or he would not suckle her breast. His mother converted, and Abū’l-Ghāzī writes that the Turkic peoples of Yafes from the time of Qara Khan had been Muslim but had lost the faith. Oghuz Khan restored Islamic belief.

Seljuks

The Seljuks originated from the Kinik branch of the Oghuz Turks, who in the 9th century lived on the periphery of the Muslim world, north of the Caspian Sea and Aral Sea in their Yabghu Khaganate of the Oghuz confederacy. During the 11th century, they established the Great Seljuk Empire under the command of the Seljuk chieftains Toghrul Beg and Chaghri Beg.

Anushteginids
There are certain historical sources that state that the Anushteginids, who ruled vast parts of Central Asia from 1077 to 1231 under the title of Khwarazmshahs, descended from the Begdili tribe of the Oghuz Turks.

The dynasty was founded by commander Anush Tigin Gharchai, a former Turkic slave of the Seljuq sultans, who was appointed as governor of Khwarezm. His son, Qutb ad-Din Muhammad I, became the first hereditary Shah of Khwarezm.

Qara Qoyunlu
Qara Qoyunlu was a tribal confederation of Oguz Turkic nomadic tribes from the Oguz tribe of Yiva, which existed in the 14-15th centuries in Western Asia, on the territory of modern Azerbaijan, Armenia, Iraq, northwestern Iran and eastern Turkey.

Aq Qoyunlu
The Aq Qoyunlu Sultans claimed descent from Bayindir Khan, through a grandson of Oghuz Khagan.

Ottomans
Ottoman historian and ambassador to the Qara Qoyunlu, Şükrullah states that Ertuğrul's lineage goes to Gökalp, a son of Oghuz Khagan. The author states that the information was shown during a court of Jahan Shah, from a book written in Mongolian script.

, in early 15th century, traced Osman's genealogy to Oghuz Khagan, through his senior grandson of his senior son, so giving the Ottoman sultans primacy among Turkish monarchs. Yazıcıoğlu quotes as follows:

Bayezid I advanced this claim against Timur, who denigrated the Ottoman lineage.

According to Ottoman historian Neşri, Osman had a grandfather with a king's name and came from a lineage of the senior branch of Oghuz family:

Cem Sultan, Bayezid II's brother, linked their genealogy to Oghuz Khagan that would prevail as a tool of legitimization of the sixteenth century onwards:

Legend

According to a Turkic legend, Oghuz was born in Central Asia as the son of Qara Khan, leader of the Turkic people. He started talking as soon as he was born. He stopped drinking his mother's milk after the first time and asked for kymyz (an alcoholic beverage made with fermented horse milk) and meat. After that, he grew up supernaturally fast and in only forty days he became a young adult. At the time of his birth, the lands of the Turkic people were preyed upon by a dragon named Kiyant. Oghuz armed himself and went to kill the dragon. He set a trap for the dragon by hanging a freshly killed deer in a tree, then killed the great dragon with a bronze lance and cut off its head with a steel sword.

After Oghuz killed Kiyant, he became a people's hero. He formed a special warrior band from the forty sons of forty Turkic begs (lords, chiefs), thus gathering the clans together. But his Chinese stepmother and half-brother, who was the heir to the throne, became intimidated by his power and convinced Qara Khan that Oghuz was planning to dethrone him. Qara Khan decided to assassinate Oghuz at a hunting party. Oghuz learned about this plan and instead killed his father and became the khan. His stepmother and half-brother fled to Chinese lands.

After Oghuz became the khan, he went to the steppes by himself to praise and pray to Tengri. While praying, he saw a circle of light coming from the sky with a supernaturally beautiful girl standing in the light. Oghuz fell in love with the girl and married her. He had three sons whom he named Gün (Sun), Ay (Moon), and Yıldız (Star) (all in Turkish). Later, Oghuz went hunting and saw another mesmerizing girl inside a tree. He married her as well and had three more sons whom he named Gök (Sky), Dağ (Mountain), and Deniz (Sea) (in Turkish).

After his sons were born, Oghuz Khan gave a great toy (feast) and invited all of his begs (lords). At the feast, he gave this order to his lords:

Then, he sent letters to the Kings of the Four Directions, saying: "I am the Khan of the Turks. And I will be Khan of the Four Corners of the Earth. I want your obedience."

Altun Khan (Golden Khan), on the right corner of the earth, submitted his obedience, but Urum (Roman), Khan of the left corner, did not. Oghuz declared war on Urum Khan and marched his army to the west. One night, a large male wolf with grey fur (which is an avatar of Tengri) came to his tent in an aura of light. He said, "Oghuz, you want to march against Urum, I want to march before your army." So, the grey sky-wolf marched before the Turkic army and guided them. The two armies fought near the river İtil (Volga). Oghuz Khan won the battle. Then, Oghuz and his six sons carried out campaigns in Turkistan, India, Iran, Egypt, Iraq and Syria, with the grey wolf as their guide. He became the Khan of the Four Corners of the Earth.

In his old age, Oghuz saw a dream. He called his six sons and sent them to the east and the west. His elder sons found a golden bow in the east. His younger sons found three silver arrows in the west. Oghuz Khan broke the golden bow into three pieces and gave each to his three older sons Gün, Ay, and Yıldız. He said, "My older sons, take this bow and shoot your arrows to the sky like this bow." He gave the three silver arrows to his three younger sons Gök, Dağ and Deniz and said, "My younger sons, take these silver arrows. A bow shoots arrows and you are to be like the arrow." Then, he passed his lands on to his sons, Bozoks (Gray Arrows - elder sons) and Üçoks (Three Arrows - younger sons) at a final banquet.
(Abū’l-Ghāzī identifies the lineage symbols, tamga seals and ongon spirit guiding birds, as well as specifying the political hierarchy and seating order at banquets for these sons and their 24 sons). Then he said:

Historical precursor and legacy

According to Abulgazi, Oguz Khan could have lived four thousand years before Prophet Muhammad during the time of the legendary ancient king Keyumars. French academician of the 18th century J.-S. Bailly refers the period of Khan's life to the 29th century B.C., the Russian geographer and historian of the 18th century P.Rychkov and Soviet historian O. Tumanovich - to the 7th century B.C. The French Encyclopedia of Diderot and d'Alembert mentions that Oghuz Khan lived long before the Persian king Cyrus II. 

Swedish geographer and cartographer of the 17th-18th centuries Philip Johan von Strahlenberg, based on the Ancient Greek historian Diodorus Siculus and other historians, concludes that Oghuz Khan was the leader of the ancient Scythian peoples, under whose leadership they conquered vast territories in the Middle East, Southeast Europe and Egypt in ancient times. Stralenberg also notes that among the Asian peoples, Oghuz Khan enjoys the same fame as Alexander the Great and Julius Caesar among Europeans.

In scientific literature, the name of Maodun is usually associated with Oghuz Khagan. The reason for that is a striking similarity of the Oghuz-Kagan biography in the Turko-Persian manuscripts (Rashid al-Din, Hondemir, Abulgazi) with the Maodun biography in the Chinese sources (feud between the father and son and murder of the former, the direction and sequence of conquests, etc.), which was first noticed by N.Ya. Bichurin (Collection of information, pp. 56–57).

Oghuz Khan is sometimes considered the legendary founder of most Turkic people, and ancestor of the Oghuz subbranch. Even today, subbranches of Oghuz are classified in order of the legendary six sons and 24 grandsons of Oghuz Khan. In history, Turkmen dynasties often rebelled or claimed sovereignty by saying their rank was higher than the existing dynasty in this tribal classification.

Oghuz Khan appears on the 100 manat banknote.

Oğuz and Oğuzhan are a common masculine Turkish and Turkic given names, which come from Oghuz Khan.

Mary Province's district Oguzhan, in Turkmenistan, is named after him.

The International airport in Ashgabat, Turkmenistan is named after Oghuz Khan.

Footnotes

See also
 Book of Dede Korkut
 Ergenekon

References

 Abū’l Ghāzī. 1958. Rodoslovnaia Turkmen. Andrei N. Kononov, ed. Moscow: Nauka.
 İlker Evrim Binbaş, Encyclopædia Iranica, "Oguz Khan Narratives" Welcome to Encyclopaedia Iranica, accessed 7 July 2012.
 Golden, Peter B. 1992. An introduction to the history of the Turkic peoples. Ethnogenesis and state formation in medieval and early modern Eurasia and the Middle East. Wiesbaden: Harrassowitz.
 Light, Nathan. Genealogy, history, nation
Nationalities Papers: The Journal of Nationalism and Ethnicity. Volume 39, Issue 1, 2011, Pages 33 – 53.
 Pelliot, Paul. 1930. Sur la légende d'Uγuz-khan en écriture ouigoure. T'oung Pao. Second Series. 27: 4–5. pp. 247–358.
 Rašīd ad-Dīn. Die Geschichte der Oġuzen des Rašīd ad-Dīn. Karl Jahn, trans. Vienna: 1969
 Shcherbak, Aleksandr Mikhaǐlovich. Oguz-name. Muhabbatname. Moscow, 1959.
 Woods, John E. 1976. The Aqquyunlu Clan, Confederation, Empire: a study in 15th/16th Century Turco-Iranian Politics. Minneapolis: Bibliotheca Islamica.

Oghuz Turks
Legendary Islamic people